Kean, ou Désordre et génie (also known as Edmund Kean: Prince Among Lovers) is a 1924 French drama film directed by Alexandre Volkoff, and starring Ivan Mosjoukine as the actor Edmund Kean. It is an adaptation of the 1836 play Kean by Alexandre Dumas.

Cast
Ivan Mosjoukine as Edmund Kean
Nathalie Lissenko as La comtesse Elena de Koefeld
Nicolas Koline as Solomon
Otto Detlefsen as Prince of Wales
Mary Odette as Anna Damby
Kenelm Foss as Lord Mewill
Pauline Po as Ophélie / Juliette

References

External links

Edmund Kean at silentera.com

French historical drama films
French silent feature films
French black-and-white films
French films based on plays
Films based on works by Alexandre Dumas
Films directed by Alexandre Volkoff
1920s historical drama films
Films set in the 19th century
Films set in England
Films about actors
Films set in London
1924 drama films
1924 films
Silent drama films
1920s French films